Attina Marie Cannaday  (born September 8, 1965) was charged with robbery, kidnapping, and homicide and is the inspiration for the film Too Young to Die? She was convicted of the kidnap and murder of U.S. Air Force Sergeant Ronald Wojcik and was initially sentenced to death. The guilty verdict was upheld, but the sentence was reversed in 1984, Cannaday v. State, 455 So.2d 713, 720 (Miss. 1984). Cannaday was re-sentenced to one life sentence and two 25-year sentences at Central Mississippi Correctional Facility. She was released on parole on March 9, 2008.

Early life 
Cannaday's mother worked as a stripper in Mobile, Alabama. During her childhood, Cannaday was sexually abused by her father. She was married at age thirteen and divorced by age fourteen, which gave her the opportunity to leave home. After her divorce, Cannaday worked as a sex worker and dancer. Cannaday was said to be handicapped due to her IQ of 71.

Crimes 
In 1982, Cannaday met and became lovers with Sergeant Ronald Wojcik, a twenty-nine year old divorcee with two children. Cannaday was sixteen at the time, though Wojcik did not know this initially. She and Wojcik separated when Wojcik found out Cannaday's true age and his military superiors discovered the affair.

Later that year, Cannaday; David Randolph Gray (a twenty-eight year old unemployed man) and Dawn Bushart (a fifteen-year old), kidnapped Wojcik and his girlfriend, Sandra Sowash. Cannaday forced the pair into Wojcik's van and drove Wojcik, Sowash, Gray, and Bushart for a distance and at one point suggested that Gray should rape Sowash. Cannaday stopped the car near a wooded area and Sowash escaped and called the Harrison County Sheriff's Department. Initially, Cannaday told the police that Gray was solely responsible for killing Wojcik but later told a jailer of her involvement in the murder.

Trial 
Cannaday was charged with robbery, kidnapping, and homicide in the state of Mississippi in 1982. Cannaday's trial began September 20, 1982. She, Gray, and Bushart were all tried separately. The jury found Cannaday guilty of murder and sentenced her to death by lethal injection on September 23, 1982. After an appeal, the Supreme Court of Mississippi affirmed the guilty verdict but held that the death sentence was inappropriate given the misuse of Cannaday's statement to the jailer, Cannaday's age, and the fact that Gray, who physically committed the murder, was sentenced to death himself. (Gray, a habitual offender, had his sentence later reversed to life imprisonment.) In 1984, Cannaday was re-sentenced to one life sentence and two twenty-five year life sentences. The state granted Cannaday parole in 2008.

Legacy 
Cannaday's crimes and subsequent trial are partly the inspiration for the 1990 TV movie Too Young to Die?. Juliette Lewis played a character loosely based on Cannaday.

The Cannaday v. State trial has been cited as influential in its interpretation of the Eighth Amendment, the prohibition of cruel and unusual punishment. The United States' Supreme Court did not rule sentencing a minor to death as unconstitutional until 2005, but the Mississippi Supreme Court's decision to reverse Cannaday's sentence in 1984 explicitly cited the Eighth Amendment as the basis for its decision.

References

1965 births
Living people
American children
American female murderers
American female criminals
American people convicted of murder
American prisoners sentenced to death
American prisoners sentenced to life imprisonment
People convicted of murder by Mississippi
Prisoners sentenced to death by Mississippi
Prisoners sentenced to life imprisonment by Mississippi
Minors convicted of murder
People paroled from life sentence
American people convicted of kidnapping
American people convicted of robbery
People from Mobile, Alabama